Mount Edgecumbe is located at the southern end of Kruzof Island, Alaska, about  west of Sitka.

Mount Edgecumbe has not had a major eruption in 4000 years. It has been classified by the Alaska Volcano Observatory (AVO) as "historically active". Mount Edgecumbe was a prop in a 1974 April Fools' Joke, which involved tricking the citizens of Sitka into believing the volcano was erupting.

Name
The indigenous Tlingit people considered the mountain to be sacred. In the Tlingit language, the mountain is called L’ux, which means "to flash" or "blinking," purportedly because the Tlingit people first discovered it while it was smoking or erupting.

On August 16, 1775, Spanish explorer Juan de la Bodega named the mountain Montaña de San Jacinto to honor Saint Hyacinth, whose feast day is celebrated on 17 August.
Captain James Cook passed the mountain on May 2, 1778, during his third voyage and named it Mount Edgecumbe, presumably after a hill overlooking Plymouth Harbor, England, or possibly for George, Earl of Edgcumbe.
Explorer George Vancouver later adopted the name chosen by Cook, and it came into popular usage.

Ascent
The first recorded ascent was made in July 1805 by Captain Urey Lisianski of the Imperial Russian Navy. In the 1930s a trail to the top of the mountain was made by the Civilian Conservation Corps as part of a New Deal program to ease the Great Depression.

A three-sided cabin built by the Conservation Corps lies about  up trail. The trail can be muddy and wet in places, the last  are a steep climb, and bears may be present. The difficulty of the trail is listed as "moderate."

Eruptions
 7620 BC
 3810 BC
 2220 BC ±100 years

Eruption hoax

On April 1, 1974, a local prankster named Oliver "Porky" Bickar ignited 70 old tires in the crater, which he had flown in for an April Fools' Day joke. The dark smoke rising from the crater convinced nearby residents of Sitka, Alaska that the volcano was erupting. The hoax was soon revealed, as around the rim of the volcano, "April Fool" was spray-painted in  letters. Porky had notified the FAA and the Sitka Police Department beforehand but had forgotten to notify the Coast Guard. The Guardian reports that Bickar had been planning the prank for four years, and lists it among the ten best Aprils Fools hoaxes of all time.

Recent activity
After about 800 years of "dormancy" at Mount Edgecumbe, researchers observed hundreds of small earthquakes in April 2022. Analysis by the AVO following the swarm revealed deformation starting in August 2018 in an  diameter area to the east of the mountain. Uplift totalled  since the start and occurred at  a year in its center. This deformation is likely related to a magmatic intrusion at  depth, but does not necessarily indicate an impending eruption. "Intrusions of new magma under volcanoes do not always result in volcanic eruptions. The deformation and earthquake activity at Edgecumbe may cease with no eruption occurring. If the magma rises closer to the surface, this would lead to changes in the deformation pattern and an increase in earthquake activity. Therefore, it is very likely that if an eruption were to occur it would be preceded by additional signals that would allow advance warning."  

On 23 May 2022 the AVO announced that they had "placed a seismometer and GPS sensor on Kruzof Island to better monitor the Mount Edgecumbe volcanic field. This station will improve our ability to detect smaller earthquakes, locate earthquakes more precisely, and measure deformation."

See also
List of volcanoes in the United States

References

External links

 Topographic map of Mount Edgecumbe (1:250,000 scale) from USGS Sitka and Port Alexander
 Alaska Volcano Observatory

Mountains of Alaska
Volcanoes of Alaska
Dormant volcanoes
Stratovolcanoes of the United States
Volcanoes of Sitka, Alaska
Civilian Conservation Corps in Alaska
Mountains of Sitka, Alaska
Hoaxes in the United States
Holocene stratovolcanoes
Sacred mountains
Tlingit culture